Maria Brandin (born 4 September 1963 in Kungälv) is a Swedish rower.

References 
 
 

1963 births
Living people
Swedish female rowers
Rowers at the 1988 Summer Olympics
Rowers at the 1992 Summer Olympics
Rowers at the 1996 Summer Olympics
Rowers at the 2000 Summer Olympics
Olympic rowers of Sweden
World Rowing Championships medalists for Sweden
People from Kungälv Municipality
Sportspeople from Västra Götaland County
20th-century Swedish women